The 1977 Cork Intermediate Hurling Championship was the 68th staging of the Cork Intermediate Hurling Championship since its establishment by the Cork County Board in 1909. The draw for the opening round fixtures took place at the Cork Convention on 30 January 1977. The championship ran from 22 May to 2 October 1977.

On 2 October 1977 Ballinhassig won the championship following a 1–16 to 1–11 defeat of Ballyhea in the final at Páirc Uí Chaoimh. This was their second championship title overall and their first title since 1975.

Results

First round

Quarter-finals

Semi-finals

Final

References

Cork Intermediate Hurling Championship
Cork Intermediate Hurling Championship